Walter Brown may refer to:

Politics
 Walter Brown (Lord Provost), Lord Provost of Edinburgh, 1827–1829
 Walter L. Brown (1846–1924), New York politician
 Walter Folger Brown (1869–1961), U.S. Postmaster General
 Walter George Brown (1875–1940), Canadian Member of Parliament, 1939–1940
 Walter B. Brown (1920–1998), American politician and businessman from South Carolina
 Walt Brown (politician) (Walter Frederick Brown, born 1926), Oregon state senator, Socialist Party USA presidential candidate

Sports
 Jumbo Brown (Walter George Brown, 1907–1966), American baseball player
 Walter Brown (baseball) (1915–1991), American baseball pitcher
 Walter Brown (canoeist) (1925–2011), Australian canoer
 Walter Brown (cricketer) (1868–1954), Indian-born English cricketer
 Walter Brown (footballer, born 1867) (1867–?), English football forward
 Walt Brown (racing driver) (1911–1951), American racecar driver
 Walter A. Brown (1905–1964), founding owner of the Boston Celtics

Other
 Walter Francis Brown (1853–1929), American painter and illustrator
 Walter Lewis Brown (1861–1931), American librarian
 Walter Brown (soldier) (1885–1942), Australian recipient of the Victoria Cross
 Walter Brown (mathematician) (1886–1957), Scottish mathematician and engineer
 Walter Brown (singer) (1917–1956), American blues shouter who sang with Jay McShann's band
 Walter Brown (actor) (1927–2013), actor from New Zealand
 Walt Brown (creationist) (born 1937), lecturer on creationism
 Walter Brown (chaplain) (1910–1944), Canadian military chaplain
 Walter the Softy Fictional Character in The Beano, also known as Walter Brown

See also
USS Walter S. Brown (DE-258), US Navy escort destroyer named after a machinist's mate killed at Pearl Harbor
Walter Browne (disambiguation)